Dong District (Dong-gu, lit. East District) is a gu (district) in northeastern part of Daegu metropolitan city of South Korea. Daegu city itself lies in the southeastern part of Korean Peninsula. It has a population of 343,678.  The district covers 182.35 km², for about 20% of Daegu's total area.

Dong-gu first emerged as the "eastern district office" (동부출장소) in 1938.  It achieved gu status in 1963.  In 1998, the administrative divisions were reorganized, and the former 26 dong were reorganized as 20 dong.

Administrative divisions

Ansim-dong
Bangchon-dong
Bullobongmu-dong
Dongchon-dong
Dopyeong-dong
Gongsan-dong
Haean-dong
Hyomok-dong
Jijeo-dong
Sinam-dong
Sincheon-dong

Education
International schools in Dong-gu include:
Daegu International School
Daegu Chinese Elementary School or Korea Daeguhwagyo Elementary School (한국대구화교초등학교)

Sister cities
 Huangshan, China

Notes and references

See also
Subdivisions of South Korea
Geography of South Korea

External links
Official site, in English

 
Districts of Daegu

zh:南区 (大邱)